The scenedesmus obliquus mitochondrial code (translation table 22) is a genetic code found in the mitochondria of Scenedesmus obliquus, a species of green algae.

Code

Differences from the standard code

Systematic range and comments
 Scenedesmus obliquus

See also
 List of genetic codes

References

Molecular genetics
Gene expression
Protein biosynthesis